Manuel Blanco Rodríguez (born 1 March 1983 in Seville, Andalusia) is a Spanish retired footballer who played as a right back.

External links

1983 births
Living people
Spanish footballers
Footballers from Seville
Association football defenders
Segunda División players
Segunda División B players
Tercera División players
Sevilla Atlético players
Sevilla FC players
UEFA Cup winning players
CD Tenerife players
Alicante CF footballers
Albacete Balompié players
Ontinyent CF players
AD Ceuta footballers
Écija Balompié players
Xerez CD footballers
Atlético Sanluqueño CF players